The Torneo Nacional de Clubes 2016 (2016 Clubs National Tournament) was the 41st edition of the main clubs handball tournament organised by the Confederación Argentina de Handball, it was held between 04–08 October at the city of Comodoro Rivadavia.

Groups Stage

Group A

Group B

Knockout stage

Championship bracket

5–8th place bracket

Final

Final standing

Awards
All-star team
Goalkeeper:  Tomás Villarroel
Right Wing:  Ramiro Martínez
Right Back:  Federico Pizarro
Playmaker:  Nicolás Bono
Left Back:  Juan Pablo Fernández
Left Wing:  Leonardo Werner
Pivot:  Mariano Canepa

References

External links
CAH Official website

Arg